Jacob Fortune-Lloyd (born 18 January 1988) is an English actor. He has played the role of Francis Weston in the BBC series Wolf Hall (2015), Francesco Salviati in  Medici (2018), and Townes in the Netflix chess period drama The Queen's Gambit (2020). In film has appeared in Crooked House (2017), Star Wars: The Rise of Skywalker (2019), and See How They Run (2021).

Early life 
Fortune-Lloyd was born in the West London Borough of Hillingdon, the son of journalist John Lloyd. Fortune-Lloyd is Jewish. He studied at St. Anne's College, Oxford University where he earned a Bachelor of Arts in English literature. He then went on to train at the Guildhall School of Music and Drama, graduating in 2014. As a student, he performed in various plays such as Agamemnon, The Man of Mode, Guys & Dolls, and Medieval Mystery Plays.

Career
As a theatre actor, Fortune-Lloyd starred in a number of Royal Shakespeare Company theatre and other productions, including The Importance of Being Earnest, The Merchant of Venice The Moderate Soprano, Macbeth and Othello.

Fortune-Lloyd starred as Archbishop Francesco Salviati in the medieval drama series Medici in 2018, and has appeared as a Sith fleet officer in Star Wars: The Rise of Skywalker (Episode IX). Fortune-Lloyd starred as Francis Weston for five episodes of the BAFTA-winning series Wolf Hall alongside Mark Rylance, Claire Foy, and Jonathan Pryce. Fortune-Lloyd starred as D.L. Townes for four episodes of the Netflix chess miniseries The Queen's Gambit alongside Anya Taylor-Joy.

In 2021, Fortune-Lloyd appeared as Gideon Tooms in the week 15 episode of Midsomer Murders. Fortune-Lloyd has been cast as the Beatles former manager Brian Epstein in the film Midas Man, which began filming in 2021.

In 2022, Fortune-Lloyd was names as Screen International's Stars of Tomorrow for all his film, television and theatre work to date.

Filmography

Film

Live streaming theatre

Television

Music Videos

References

External links 

Pindrop Profile
Jacob Fortune-Lloyd - MFI Profile
Jacob Fortune-Lloyd - Showreel

Living people
People from Hillingdon
1988 births
21st-century English male actors
Alumni of the Guildhall School of Music and Drama
Alumni of the University of Oxford
English male film actors
English male stage actors
English male television actors
Jewish English male actors
Male actors from London